Commissions are constituted by the Government of India either on an ad hoc or permanent basis, to guide, advise or provide solutions to various issues coming under the concerned ministry.

List of commissions

Permanent commissions

Right to information
Commission

Ad hoc commissions

See also
 Standing committees of India
 List of Indian parliamentary committees

References

External links
 

 
Commissions
Indian commissions